Tore Torvbråten (born 28 January 1968) is a Norwegian curler and Olympic medalist. He received a bronze medal at the 1998 Winter Olympics in Nagano.

He received a bronze medal at the 2001 World Championships in Lausanne;  the Norwegian team lost 3-4 to Sweden in the semi-final, and beat Canada 10-9 in the bronze final.

References

External links

1968 births
Living people
Norwegian male curlers
Olympic curlers of Norway
Curlers at the 1998 Winter Olympics
Olympic bronze medalists for Norway
Olympic medalists in curling
Medalists at the 1998 Winter Olympics